Dark River is a 1952 Argentine drama film directed by Hugo del Carril, starring del Carril, Adriana Benetti and Raúl del Valle. It is based on a novel by Alfredo Varela. The storyline is about exploitation of peons, and the film has a populist message that ties in with the director's sympathy for Peronism. The film won the Silver Condor Award for Best Film.

It was selected as the sixth greatest Argentine film of all time in a poll conducted by the Museo del Cine Pablo Ducrós Hicken in 1977, while it ranked 4th in the 1984 edition and 3rd in the 2000 edition. In a new version of the survey organized in 2022 by the specialized magazines La vida util, Taipei and La tierra quema, presented at the Mar del Plata International Film Festival, the film reached the 14 position.

Synopsis
The brothers Santos and Rufino Peralta are used like animals in the workplace at the Parana Stop. There they encounter enormous hardship and inhuman conditions of work as a consequence of the immense greed of the managers. A worker's rebellion is maturing, to the point that it is developed into trade union of workers who respond against their grief. Finally, the workers plot a counterattack and punish their corrupt employers.

Cast
Hugo del Carril as Santos Peralta
Adriana Benetti as Amelia
Raúl del Valle as Aguilera
Pedro Laxalt as Rufino Peralta
Gloria Ferrandiz as Doña Flora
Eloy Álvarez as Alí
Herminia Franco as Flor de Lis
Luis Otero as A Peon
Joaquín Petrocino as Barreiro
Francisco Audenino
Carlos Escobares
Mecha López
Domingo Garibotto as Amelia's Father
Jacinto Aicardi
Ricardo Carenzo

Production

The film is based on a novel by Alfredo Varela, but Varela is not mentioned in the credits because he was in prison as a consequence of his communist activities. The film was shot on location in the upper Paraná region.

Release
The film premiered on 9 October 1952 in Buenos Aires and on 25 February 1956 in the United States. It was distributed by Cinematográfica Cinco and Del Carril-Barbieri (DCB) in Argentina and the Times Film Corporation in the United States. Argentina released the film again in 2005 at the Mar del Plata Film Festival on 11 March 2005.

Reception

Critical response
A. H. Weiler of The New York Times wrote that the film "makes its points realistically and, occasionally, with harrowing effects" but "is somewhat less than striking as professionally-wrought drama". "As a tract against man's inhumanity to man," Weiler wrote, "it is sincere and powerful. But the spinning of this somber tale, like its outrages, is routine and more primitive than polished." The critic wrote about the performances: "Although Señor Del Carril has not extracted outstanding performances from some of his principals, his portrayal is restrained yet forceful. And, while the climactic scene is rudimentary melodrama, some of his supporting players contribute seemingly dedicated characterizations."

Accolades
The film received the awards for Best Picture, Director and Supporting Actor (Pedro Laxalt) from the Argentine Academy of Cinematography Arts and Sciences. It received four awards, including Best Film and Best Director, from the Argentine Film Critics Association in 1953. It also won a Special Mention at the Venice Film Festival.

References

External links
 

1952 drama films
1952 films
Argentine black-and-white films
Argentine drama films
Films based on Mexican novels
Films directed by Hugo del Carril
1950s Spanish-language films